Abasan al-Saghira is a Palestinian agricultural town located 2 km southeast of Khan Yunis in the Khan Yunis Governorate in the southern Gaza Strip. According to the Palestinian Central Bureau of Statistics, Abasan al-Saghira had a population of 5,650 Muslim inhabitants.

History
In 1886, at the end of the Ottoman era, Abasan al-Saghira consisted of about ten huts, with old building stones.

British Mandate Period
In the 1922 census of Palestine conducted by the British Mandate authorities,  Abassan (presumably both   Abasan al-Kabira and  Abasan al-Saghira) had a population of 695; all Muslims, increasing in the 1931 census (when they were clearly counted together) to 1144, still all Muslim, in 186 houses.

In the 1945 statistics  the two Abasans were still counted together, and  had   a population of 2,230, all Muslims,  with 16,084  dunams of land, according to an official land and population survey. Of this, 92 dunams were for plantations and irrigable land, 15,616 used for cereals, while 69  dunams were built-up land.

References

Bibliography

External links
 Welcome To 'Abasan al-Saghir

Towns in the Gaza Strip
Khan Yunis Governorate
Municipalities of the State of Palestine